James Veitch was a Scotland international rugby union player.

Rugby Union career

Amateur career

He played for Royal HSFP.

Provincial career

He played for Edinburgh District in the 1883 inter-city match.

He played for East of Scotland District in the 30 January 1886 match against West of Scotland District.

International career

He was capped 8 times for Scotland in the period 1882 to 1886.

Family

He was born to Agnes Pringle and Andrew Veitch.

References

1862 births
1917 deaths
Scottish rugby union players
Scotland international rugby union players
Royal HSFP players
Rugby union players from Penicuik
Edinburgh District (rugby union) players
East of Scotland District players
Rugby union fullbacks